Ksenia Andreyevna Stolbova (born 7 February 1992) is a retired Russian pair skater who skated with Andrei Novoselov and Fedor Klimov. She is the 2014 Olympic silver medalist, the 2014 Olympic champion in the team event, the 2014 World silver medalist, a three-time European medalist (2012 bronze, 2014, 2015 silver), the 2015–16 Grand Prix Final champion, the 2013 Winter Universiade champion, a two-time World Junior medalist (2010 bronze, 2011 silver), and a three-time Russian national champion (2014, 2015, 2017). Stolbova announced her retirement from competitions on 12 February 2020.

Personal life
Ksenia Andreyevna Stolbova was born on 7 February 1992 in Saint Petersburg, Russia. She attended the Lesgaft Academy of Physical Education in Saint Petersburg.

Career

Early career
Stolbova became interested in skating at the age of three but did not begin skating until a few years later after badgering her family. After a number of years in single skating, she wanted to try something different and made the switch to pair skating at the age of 14.

Stolbova's partnership with Artur Minchuk lasted three seasons, from 2006–07 to 2008–09. They finished 11th competing on the senior level at the Russian Championships in December 2008.

2009–11
In spring 2009, coach Ludmila Velikova partnered Stolbova with Fedor Klimov. They trained in Saint Petersburg.

During their first season together, the pair placed 2nd and 7th at their two Junior Grand Prix events, and 7th at the Final. The pair won the Russian Junior title and then bronze at Junior Worlds in 2010.

During the 2010–11 season, Stolbova/Klimov won both of their JGP events and qualified for the JGP Final. They also debuted on the senior GP circuit, finishing 5th at Skate America. They won silver at the Junior Grand Prix Final. At the 2011 Russian Championships, Stolbova/Klimov finished sixth overall in their senior national debut and won their second junior national title. They were the silver medalists at the 2011 World Junior Championships.

2011–12 season
For the Grand Prix season, Stolbova/Klimov were assigned to 2011 Trophée Eric Bompard, where they finished 7th, and 2011 Cup of Russia, where they finished 4th. Third in the short program and second in the long at the 2012 Russian Championships, the pair won their first senior national medal, silver.

Stolbova/Klimov were originally the first alternates for the 2012 European Championships but Alexander Smirnov had an emergency surgery and was not able to recover in time. Replacing Kavaguti/Smirnov at the event, Stolbova/Klimov set new personal bests in their short and long program to win their first European medal, bronze.

2012–13 season
For the 2012–13 season, Stolbova/Klimov worked on upgrading their twist to a triple. They began their international season at the 2012 Coupe de Nice, where they took the silver. Stolbova/Klimov won their first senior Grand Prix medal, bronze, at the 2012 Cup of China, and finished 5th at the 2012 Trophée Eric Bompard. They won the bronze medal at the 2013 Russian Championships.

First alternates for the 2013 European Championships, Stolbova/Klimov were called up to replace Vera Bazarova / Yuri Larionov who withdrew due to Larionov's wrist injury. After finishing sixth at Europeans in Zagreb, they won their first senior international title at the 2013 Bavarian Open. In April 2013, the pair said they wanted to move to Moscow to work with Nina Mozer, who agreed to take them in her group. The move was opposed by Oleg Nilov, the head of the Saint Petersburg skating association, arguing against a concentration of skaters in Moscow, but was authorized by the Russian skating federation.

After relocating to Moscow, the pair focused on improving their basic skating skills. Their training was interrupted when Klimov fell off a bicycle in late May 2013, resulting in a broken leg.

2013–14 season
In 2013–14, Stolbova/Klimov started their Grand Prix season with a bronze medal at the 2013 Skate America. After placing sixth in the short program and third in the free skate, they finished fourth overall at the 2013 Cup of Russia behind Canadian pair Kirsten Moore-Towers / Dylan Moscovitch. Stolbova/Klimov won the gold medal at the 2013 Winter Universiade in Trentino, Italy and then took their first national title at the 2014 Russian Championships, scoring 0.45 more than the 2012 national champions, Bazarova/Larionov.

At the 2014 European Championships, Stolbova/Klimov placed fourth in the short, first in the free skate, and scored a total of 207.98 points to win the silver medal behind Volosozhar/Trankov and ahead of Bazarova/Larionov. All three pairs were sent to the 2014 Winter Olympics. Assigned to the free skate in the inaugural Olympic team event, Stolbova/Klimov placed first in their segment and Team Russia went on to win the gold medal. In the pairs event, Stolbova/Klimov placed third in the short and advanced to second after the free skate with an overall score of 218.68 points. They won the silver medal ahead of four-time World champions Aliona Savchenko / Robin Szolkowy who took the bronze medal. Stolbova/Klimov won the silver medal in their first appearance at the 2014 World Championships.

2014–15 season
In the 2014–15 season, Stolbova/Klimov won both of their Grand Prix events, the 2014 Rostelecom Cup and 2014 Trophee Eric Bompard, and took silver at the Grand Prix Final behind Canada's Meagan Duhamel / Eric Radford. They won their second consecutive national title at the 2015 Russian Championships and went on to win silver at the 2015 European Championships behind Kavaguti/Smirnov.

Stolbova/Klimov decided not to compete at the 2015 World Championships in Shanghai, China, as they wanted to focus on learning new throw jumps.

2015–16 season
Stolbova/Klimov started the 2015–16 season competing in a challenger series at the 2015 Ondrej Nepela Trophy where they won the gold medal. They competed in their first Grand Prix of the season at the 2015 Skate America finishing 4th place. However, they polished their program and elements and won the gold medal in their second Grand Prix at the 2015 Rostelecom Cup ahead of teammates Yuko Kavaguti / Alexander Smirnov. They qualified for the 2015–16 Grand Prix Final in Barcelona where they placed first in both segments in pairs short program and in the free skate where they scored 154.60 points, just 0.06 lower than the free skate World record achieved by compatriots Tatiana Volosozhar / Maxim Trankov at the 2013 Skate America. Stolbova/Klimov landed clean side-by-side 3T-3T-2T jumps, as well as 3 Flip, 3 Salchow throws in their free skate. They won the gold medal with a total of 229.44 points.

Stolbova/Klimov withdrew from the entry list at the 2016 Russian Championships due to Klimov's allergic reaction from a therapeutic massage a week before nationals. They were selected to compete at the 2016 European Championships but withdrew before the event. A nerve problem affected Klimov's arm and shoulder muscles, preventing him from performing lifts.

At the 2016 World Championships in Boston, the pair placed 5th in the short program, 4th in the free skate, and 4th overall.

2016–17 season
During a training camp in mid-July 2016, Stolbova developed severe inflammation in her left ankle due to a nerve problem that arose after a change of skating boots.  She and Klimov withdrew from both of their Grand Prix assignments – the 2016 Rostelecom Cup and 2016 NHK Trophy. They returned to competition in late December, winning gold at the 2017 Russian Championships by a margin of 0.93 over Evgenia Tarasova / Vladimir Morozov.

In January 2017 they competed at the 2017 European Championships where they placed 4th after placing 4th in both the short program and the free skate. Two months later they competed at the 2017 World Championships where they placed 5th after placing only 13th in the short program but 3rd in the free skate.

2017–18 season
In the Grand Prix season they won two silvers, first at the 2017 Rostelecom Cup and then at the 2017 NHK Trophy. These results qualified them to the 2017–18 Grand Prix Final where they placed 4th. They then won another pair of silver medals, first at the 2018 Russian Championships and then at the 2018 European Championships. They weren't sent to the 2018 Winter Olympics because it was announced by the Russian Figure Skating Federation on 23 January 2018 that Stolbova wasn't invited to the 2018 Olympics. They later withdrew from the 2018 World Championships.

Stolbova and Klimov ended their partnership later that year, and she teamed up with Andrei Novoselov.

2019–20 season
Stolbova and her new partner first performed at the 2019 Russian test skates.  She described herself as "overwhelmed by emotions. We've waited a long time for this comeback. We're coming back with renewed bodies, renewed mindset, renewed emotions."  Following the test skates, Stolbova/Novoselov discard their "I'll Take Care of You" short program in favour of a new one set to "Rebirth" by Hi-Finesse, first seen when they made their competitive debut at the 2019 Rostelecom Cup.  They placed third in the short program, despite a doubled jump by Novoselov.  In the free skate, errors on both jumping passes, a throw, and two lifts dropped them to fifth place overall.

Programs

With Novoselov

With Klimov

Competitive highlights
GP: Grand Prix; CS: Challenger Series; JGP: Junior Grand Prix

With Novoselov

With Klimov

With Minchuk

Ladies' singles

Detailed results
Small medals for short and free programs awarded only at ISU Championships. At team events, medals awarded for team results only.

With Klimov

2009–2010 to 2010–2011

References

External links

 
 

Russian female pair skaters
1992 births
Living people
Figure skaters from Saint Petersburg
World Figure Skating Championships medalists
European Figure Skating Championships medalists
World Junior Figure Skating Championships medalists
Figure skaters at the 2014 Winter Olympics
Olympic figure skaters of Russia
Medalists at the 2014 Winter Olympics
Olympic medalists in figure skating
Olympic gold medalists for Russia
Olympic silver medalists for Russia
Season's world number one figure skaters
Universiade medalists in figure skating
Universiade gold medalists for Russia
Competitors at the 2013 Winter Universiade